On May 8, 2016, two buses and a fuel tanker collided on a major highway, killing at least 73 people in the Muqur district, Ghazni Province, Afghanistan on the Kabul-Kandahar highway. More than 50 other people injured in the accident were taken to hospital in Ghazni Province. All three vehicles were set ablaze and completely engulfed in fire after the collision on the main road linking the capital, Kabul, to the southern city of Kandahar. 

Some sources claimed that "dozens" were injured. Both buses involved carried 125 passengers, and were travelling from Kabul to Kandahar. Many of the injured were very seriously injured and in critical condition.

Aftermath  
Mohammadullah Ahmadi, the director of the provincial traffic department, said the crash was caused by reckless driving. Local residents helped fire fighters and first responders pull survivors from the wreckage. Health ministry spokesman Ismail Kawasi said that most of those who died in the crash were "completely burned beyond recognition". The dead included many women and children. The vehicles were completely gutted and clouds of acrid smoke shrouded the scene of the crash on the Kabul-Kandahar highway. There were around 125 people travelling on the buses. 

Drivers often speed on the highway to avoid insurgent activity, especially from the Taliban. The speed is to avoid the checkpoints that the Taliban set up, where they sometimes kidnap and kill civilians, such is what happened during the Kunduz-Takhar highway hostage crisis where hundreds were kidnapped and many killed after they were captured at a Taliban checkpoint.

See also 
List of traffic collisions (2010–present)
September 2016 Afghanistan road crash

References 

2016 disasters in Afghanistan
2016 in Afghanistan
2016 road incidents
2010s road incidents in Asia
Road crash
Bus incidents in Asia
May 2016 events in Afghanistan
Road incidents in Afghanistan